Nima Shahrokh Shahi (born 8 August 1981) is an Iranian actor, writer and director. He studied civil engineering and has a sister who lives in Sweden.

Career 
He started his career in cinema and starred in Maxx by Saman Moghadam in 2005. His most notable activities are Faseleha series by Hossein Soheili Zadeh, Tambourine by Parisa Bakhtavar and Standardized Patient series by Saeed Agha Khani.

Nima Shahrokh Shahi has appeared in more than 130 films, TV series and home shows.

In recent years, he has attended Asghar Farhadi's advanced directing classes and recently made two short films, which have been released worldwide by the international company American Bright Light Movies. He is also making a feature film on topics related to schizophrenia and other similar psychiatric disorders.

Filmography

As actor

As director

References

External links 
 
Nima shahrokh shahi on instagram 

1981 births
Living people
21st-century Iranian male actors
Iranian film directors